MingDao University (MDU) is a private university located in Pitou Township, Changhua County, Taiwan.

MingDao's specialized areas of research include renewable energy engineering (especially solar, wind, and hydrogen), and its Department of Post Modern Agriculture is active in the promotion of organic agriculture across East and Southeast Asia. The university's motto is "Wisdom, Virtue, Honesty, Progress."

History
The institution was founded as the MingDao School of Management in 2001, and was accorded university status by the Ministry of Education (ROC) in 2007. In 2020, the university had an enrollment rate of less than 60%.

Faculties
 College of Applied Science
 College of Design
 College of Hospitality and Tourism Management
 College of Humanities
 College of Management

Centers and Institutes
 Institute of Chinese Studies
 Graduate Institute of Curriculum and Instruction
 Mandarin Training Center (MTC)
 Sustainable Energy Research Center
 Photovoltaics Research Center
 Surface Engineering Research Center
 Agriculture and Biotechnology Research Center

International student exploitation
In November 2018 it was reported in Eswatini that Mingdao University tricked more than 40 Eswatini students in working full five-day shifts in a chicken processing plant. 

MingDao University recruited over 40 students from Eswatini to take part in a work-study program. The program, advertised in June of 2018, was called the "Taiwan Work/Study Scholarship" and offered applicants "hands-on practical and work experience" while earning a Bachelor's in Business Administration. The advertisement claimed each student would earn a monthly wage that would cover tuition, accommodation, insurance, and other fees while still leaving 3,000 Swazi lilangeni (US$167) a month to spare for extra spending money.

Once the students began the college program in Changhua County's Pitou Township, they were shocked to realize they were being sent to a freezing factory with temperatures hovering below 10 degrees Celsius to peel chicken skin. What they encountered in Taiwan was reminiscent of the case of over 40 Sri Lankan students from Kang Ning University who were duped into working in a slaughterhouse.

Yu Jung-hui (尤榮輝), chairman of the Union of Private School Educators (UPRISE), said that the students were used for "slave labor" and that MingDao University is "almost an international fraud" and called for an investigation.

See also
 List of universities in Taiwan

References

External links
 

2001 establishments in Taiwan
Educational institutions established in 2001
Private universities and colleges in Taiwan
Universities and colleges in Changhua County